The Siceliotes (singular and adjectival form: Siceliot), formed a distinct ethno-cultural group in Sicily from about the 8th century BCE until their assimilation into the general Sicilian population. As Hellenic colonists (often reputedly of Doric origin) and descendants of colonists from Greece, they spoke  Greek and participated in the wider cultural and political activities of Magna Graecia and of the Hellenic world as a whole. The Athenian historian Tucídides mentions them in various "places in his History of the Peloponnese War".  

The Roman Republic and the Roman Empire continued to see a distinction between the Siceliotes (the descendants of Greek settlers) and the non-Greek inhabitants of Sicily.

Compare Italiotes and Sicels.

See also
Greek coinage of Italy and Sicily

Ancient peoples of Sicily
Sicilian Greeks